Liam Patrick Kelly (born 23 January 1996) is a Scottish professional footballer, who plays as a goalkeeper for Scottish Premiership side Motherwell. Kelly has previously played for Rangers, East Fife, Livingston and Queens Park Rangers. He has also represented Scotland in youth internationals.

Club career

Rangers
Kelly joined Rangers aged ten years-old and played in the club's youth sides, notably scoring the final penalty during Rangers under-17s Glasgow Cup win in 2012.

After training with the first-team for the majority of the 2014–15 season and featuring on the bench, Kelly signed a contract extension on 25 February 2015, until the summer of 2018.

Loan moves
On 8 January 2016, Kelly joined East Fife in Scottish League Two on a six-month loan. During his time at Bayview Stadium, Kelly played in 16 league matches and was part of the side which won the League Two title. Upon returning to Rangers, Kelly travelled to the US with the Rangers first-team for a pre-season training camp. However, on 15 July 2016, he was loaned out to the then Scottish League One team Livingston until January 2017. He made his debut for Livi the next day in a League Cup match against St Mirren.

Livingston
Kelly moved to Livingston, where he had previously been on loan, for an undisclosed fee in June 2018. He played regularly for Livingston in the 2018–19 season, but then invoked a release clause in his contract.

Queens Park Rangers
On 14 June 2019, Kelly signed for Queens Park Rangers for an undisclosed fee on a four-year contract. He made his debut on 13 August 2019, in an EFL Cup match against Bristol City saving two penalties in a 5–4 penalty shootout win.

Motherwell (loan)
On 6 January 2021, Kelly moved on loan to Motherwell for the remainder of the season.

Motherwell
On 5 July 2021, Kelly returned to Motherwell on a permanent transfer from Queens Park Rangers, signing a three-year contract.

International career
Kelly has represented Scotland at various age levels, up to an including the under-21 team.

Kelly received his first call-up to the senior Scotland squad in March 2019 for games against Kazakhstan and San Marino.

Style of play
Kenny Miller, who played alongside Kelly at Rangers and was also his player-manager at Livi, said of him in 2018: "He's excellent with the ball at his feet. He's a proper modern-day goalkeeper".

Personal life
He is the brother of Livingston defender Sean Kelly.

Career statistics

Honours

Club
Rangers under-17
Glasgow Cup: 2012

East Fife
Scottish League Two: 2015–16

Livingston
Scottish League One: 2016–17

References

External links

1996 births
Living people
Association football goalkeepers
Scottish footballers
Rangers F.C. players
East Fife F.C. players
Livingston F.C. players
Queens Park Rangers F.C. players
Motherwell F.C. players
Scottish Professional Football League players
Scotland youth international footballers
Scotland under-21 international footballers
English Football League players